Ngora Freda Carr Hospital, commonly known as Ngora Hospital, is a community hospital in Uganda. It is affiliated with the Anglican Church of Uganda. It was founded in 1922. It has capacity of 180 beds.

Location
The hospital is in the small town of Ngora, in Ngora District, Teso sub-region, in the  Eastern Region of Uganda.

The coordinates of Ngora Freda Carr Hospital are 01°28'42.0"N, 33°47'35.0"E (Latitude:01.478333; Longitude:33.793056

Overview
The hospital was founded in 1922 by the Anglican Church. At that time, the hospital was under the auspices of the  Soroti Diocese. As of 2014, the hospital is under the Kumi Diocese of the Church of Uganda. It is a rural, non-profit, community hospital, with a bed capacity of 180. It takes care of both outpatients and inpatients. It is the largest hospital in Ngora District, and its maternity unit serves as the District Maternity Unit, which provides general maternity services. It also offers specialized dental, gynecological, and mental health services.

Ngora Hospital is administered by a board of governors and is an affiliate of the Uganda Protestant Medical Board. It also has close collaboration with the Uganda Ministry of Health and the Ngora District Administration. The hospital serves a rural population estimated at over 157,400 in Ngora District. It also handles patients from the neighboring districts of Amuria,  Bukedea, Katakwi, Kumi, Pallisa, and Soroti.

See also
Hospitals in Uganda

References

External links
 348 Babies Born On Christmas Day 2007
www.ngorahospital.org

Hospitals in Uganda
Eastern Region, Uganda
Teso sub-region
Ngora District
Hospitals established in 1922
1922 establishments in Uganda